Last Hit may refer to:
 "Last Hit", a song by The High & Mighty, later released as "The Last Hit (feat. Eminem)" from the album Home Field Advantage
 Last Hit, an upcoming film starring UFC fighter Elias Theodorou
 Last hitting, the common act of delivering the killing blow in MOBA video games
 The Last Producer, also known as The Last Hit, a 2001 film